Sir M. Visveshwaraya Stn., Central College is a station in the Purple Line of the Namma Metro in Bangalore, India, opened to the public on 30 April 2016.

The station acquires its name from the nearby University Visvesvaraya College of Engineering, which had been named after M. Visvesvaraya, an Indian engineer, scholar, statesman and the Diwan of Mysore from 1912 to 1918.

History
The Sir M. Visveshwaraya metro station, like all other underground stations on the Purple Line, was built using the cut-and-cover method. The station is located at a depth of 60 feet. Authorities carried out 1,200 controlled blasts to dig through the tough rock structure.

Station layout

Entry/Exits
There are 5 Entry/Exit points – A, B, C, D and E. Commuters can use either of the points for their travel.

See also
Bangalore
List of Namma Metro stations
Transport in Karnataka
List of metro systems
List of rapid transit systems in India
Bangalore Metropolitan Transport Corporation

References

External links

 Bangalore Metro Rail Corporation Ltd. (Official site) 
 UrbanRail.Net – descriptions of all metro systems in the world, each with a schematic map showing all stations.

Namma Metro stations
Railway stations in India opened in 2016
2016 establishments in Karnataka